Paul-Baudouin Michel (7 September 1930 – 30 October 2020) was a Belgian composer, professor, and writer. He was a member of the Royal Academy of Science, Letters and Fine Arts of Belgium.

Biography
After he attended the Conservatoire Royal de Mons, Michel continued his studies at the Queen Elisabeth Music Chapel, where he worked on composition under Jean Absil and graduated in 1962. He worked in orchestral conducting and musical analysis at the Académie d'été in Nice. He then became director of the Académie de musique de Woluwe-Saint-Lambert, where he taught harmony and the history of music. He was a professor of music at the Conservatoire Royal de Mons and the Royal Conservatory of Brussels. He became a member of the Royal Academy of Science, Letters and Fine Arts of Belgium in 1997, and subsequently became a lecturer on new music and wrote radio broadcasts.

Paul-Baudouin Michel died on 30 October 2020 at the age of 90.

Works
Variations symphoniques
Symphonium III Jeanne la Folle
Symphonium IV dite Sommeil paradoxal
L'Oreille fertile
Engrenage
Atomes crochus
16 interludes for piano
Lamobylrinthe
 Mystère-jeu for viola and piano (1976)

Prizes
Prix Émile Doehaerd of CeBeDem
Prix de composition of the Queen Elisabeth Competition
Prix international radiophonique Paul Gilson
Prix Camille Huysmans
Prix de l'Académie Royale
Prix Koopal
Prix Créamuse
Prix Ernest Bloch de Lugano
Prix spécial of the City of Geneva

Literary Works
Il faut détruire les villes de plus de 200,000 habitants
La Lévitation et les prostituées sacrées
Le Commencement des incertitudes

References

1930 births
2020 deaths
Belgian composers
Academic staff of the Royal Conservatory of Brussels
People from La Louvière